The Singapore Forum, also known as Singapore Economic Forum (SEF), was re-established in 2022  as a high-level Asia Pacific plus G12 nations annual event held in Singapore – typically in the third week of November (date may vary in accordance with Chinese New Year).

The forum brings together policy makers, Ivy League academics and S&P Global 100 executives for up to three days to discuss the key financial, geo-economic and social issues that will define the "Asian Century": notably the growing convergence of economic and social growth dynamics in light of the Sustainable Development Goals and the way long-term asset owners such as pension funds and sovereign wealth institutions are "shifting the trillions" towards the region's asset classes — including, listed equity, private equity, venture capital and infrastructure assets.

The event is organized by the APAC Leadership Council, an Anglo-Singaporean think tank, in association with global, regional & national industry groups, asset owners' associations, policy research centres and family offices.

The 'Asset Owner of the Future' Report & Survey
The main findings of a multidisciplinary research project titled “The Asset Owner of the Future: Risks, Returns and Realism in the Age of Geoeconomics” conducted annually by the organizers are presented at the opening session of the forum. Some of the preliminary findings will also be presented in other conferences and journals in the weeks leading up to the Singapore Forum.

References

Global economic conferences
Social forums
Global policy organizations